Mark Gordon Robins (born 22 December 1969) is an English football manager and former player, who is the current manager of Coventry City in the EFL Championship. As a player, he was a striker and is best known for his time in the Premier League with Norwich City and Leicester City.

Robins began his career with Manchester United. During this period, he scored a goal against Nottingham Forest in a 1990 FA Cup tie that has subsequently been credited with "saving" manager Alex Ferguson's job at Old Trafford. After spending time with Norwich and Leicester, Robins went on to play for Reading, Manchester City, Walsall, Rotherham United, Bristol City and Sheffield Wednesday in the Football League. Robins also played across Europe during spells with FC Copenhagen, Ourense and Panionios before finishing his career with Burton Albion in the Conference National.

In 2007, he became manager of Rotherham United, and joined Barnsley in the same capacity in 2009, before leaving in 2011, following differences between him and the board. In 2012, he became manager of Coventry City until 2013 when he joined Huddersfield Town. Robins left Huddersfield in 2014 by mutual agreement. A few months later he became manager of Scunthorpe United before leaving in 2016. 

In March 2017, Robins rejoined Coventry City and a few months later won the EFL Trophy. In the 2017–18 season , Robins won the EFL League Two play-offs with the Sky Blues and were promoted to League One. After a solid eighth placed finish in League One in the 2018–19 season, Robins led Coventry to promotion to the EFL Championship as League One Champions in the 2019–20 season. He followed that up by guiding Coventry to a respectable 16th placed finish in the Championship in the 2020–21 season, and further improved upon this with a 12th placed finish in the 2021–22 season.

Club career

Manchester United
Robins played an important part in winning the FA Cup for Manchester United in 1990, which was the first trophy of manager Alex Ferguson's reign at the club, scoring the winning goal in the semi-final replay against Oldham Athletic. United were playing away from home against Nottingham Forest (one of the most successful cup teams of the late 1980s and early 1990s) on 7 January 1990, in a third round FA Cup tie. It was widely speculated in the media (but perennially denied by then-Chairman Martin Edwards) that under-pressure United manager Alex Ferguson would have been sacked had United lost and gone out of the Cup, as they were 15th in the league by this stage and had already been eliminated from the League Cup. Instead, Robins scored the winning goal from a Mark Hughes cross. That goal was a turning point in the history of the football club – Ferguson would keep his job and go on to achieve an unmatched run of success at the club over the next 23 years.

In that season, Robins scored seven First Division goals and a further two in the FA Cup, bringing his tally that season to nine in all competitions. His goal in the FA Cup third round also had the distinction of making him the player to score the first goal of the 1990s for Manchester United. He also scored one of United's two goals in the semi-final replay where they beat Oldham Athletic.

He was second only to Mark Hughes in the goalscoring charts at Old Trafford, while Hughes's regular strike-partner Brian McClair had managed a mere five goals and it was starting to look as though Robins would displace McClair as the club's regular second striker. However, McClair recovered his goalscoring form in 1990–91, and Robins managed only 19 First Division appearances and four goals. He was, however, in the squad that won the European Cup Winners' Cup that season. September was a good month for him, as he scored twice in a 3–2 home win over Queens Park Rangers in the league and the winning goal in a visit to Luton Town.

However, the 1991–92 season was a frustrating one for Robins as he played just twice in the league, failing to score, and in total made just eight appearances in all competitions. His only goals that season came in the League Cup second round at home to Portsmouth, when he scored twice in a 3–2 win at Old Trafford. When the opportunity for a place back in the first team arose in April as United were being overhauled by Leeds United in the title race, Robins was injured and unavailable for selection.

Two wry forms of consolation for Robins in a frustrating season came during the first half of the campaign. On 30 October 1991, he scored twice in their 3–1 win over Portsmouth in the League Cup third round, putting them on course for a strong run in the competition which culminated in them winning it for the very first time. On 19 November 1991, he collected a European Super Cup winner's medal (as an unused substitute) as United beat Red Star Belgrade in the game at Old Trafford.

At the end of the season, he asked to be transfer listed.

Norwich City
He left Manchester United for Norwich City for a fee of £800,000 where he played an important role in some of the club's greatest successes, including the remarkable win in the Olympiastadion against Bayern Munich in the UEFA Cup.

In his first game his two goals helped Norwich defeat Arsenal 4–2 at Highbury on the opening day of the first ever Premier League season. The Canaries were 2–0 down with a quarter of the game remaining before Robins scored the club's first Premier League goal in the 69th minute, followed swiftly by goals from wingers David Phillips and Ruel Fox, before Robins completed a 4–2 triumph with an 84th-minute goal.

He helped them qualify for the UEFA Cup at the end of the 1992–93 season, in which Norwich finished third in the Premier League, having led the league at several stages and featured in the title race until well into April, before his old club Manchester United finally won the title. His 1993–94 season was interrupted by a serious injury, and coincided with a slump in form for Norwich, who finished 12th after spending most of the first half of the season in the top five.

Leicester City
In 1994–95, after falling out with Norwich manager John Deehan, he was sold to Leicester City, but was unable to prevent them from being relegated to Division One. He did, however, help them win promotion back to the Premier League via the play-offs in 1995–96, and win the League Cup in 1996–97, when they finished ninth in the Premier League. While at Leicester Robins was loaned out to FC Copenhagen and Reading.

Leicester loaned Robins to Copenhagen in 1996. He played six games for the Danish club, scoring four goals. Among the FC Copenhagen supporters, Robins and his then attacking partner Michael Manniche got the nicknames "Batmanne and Robins".

Ourense and Panionios
After leaving Leicester in January 1998 Robins had further spells abroad playing for Spanish side Ourense and Greek side Panionios. While at Panionios he had a brief loan spell back in England for Manchester City, however this was disrupted by injury.

Later career
Robins returned to England when he signed for Walsall in the summer of 1999, and went on to score 8 goals in 46 appearances in his one season at the club. After one season at Walsall Robins signed for Rotherham United in the summer of 2000. Ironically he made his debut for the club against Walsall and scored two goals as his former side won 3–2. He went on to score 26 goals in all competitions in his first season at Rotherham, including a hat-trick in a 4–3 win over Swindon Town. In February 2003 Robins was loaned to Bristol City. He scored on his debut for the club in a Football League Trophy tie against Cambridge United. In his brief spell at Bristol City he scored 5 goals in 8 appearances and helped his side reach the 2003 Football League Trophy Final. However, by the time of the final he was recalled by Rotherham and unable to take part. Bristol City went on to win the final in his absence.

After falling out of favour at Rotherham, Robins joined Sheffield Wednesday in December 2003. As he had done at Bristol City Robins made an impressive debut for his new club in the Football League Trophy; scoring twice as Wednesday defeated Carlisle United.

Robins ended his playing career at Conference side Burton Albion, whom he joined after leaving Sheffield Wednesday in 2004. He stayed at Burton until leaving to take up an assistant manager role at Rotherham United in January 2005.

International career
Robins made his debut for the England under-21s at the Toulon Tournament in May 1990. He started the opening group game against Portugal as England lost 1−0. In the next game, he scored five goals against France in the 7−3 win, then followed that up with a goal against Russia as England qualified for the final. Robins played the whole game in the final as England beat Czechoslovakia to lift the trophy. On 11 September, he scored in the friendly against Hungary as England ran out 3−1 winners at The Dell. His last appearance was in the defeat against Poland during qualifying for the 1992 UEFA European Under-21 Championship. Overall, Robins made six appearances for the U21s and scored seven goals.

Managerial career

Rotherham United
Robins joined Rotherham United in June 2000 as a player and subsequently as assistant manager, under manager Alan Knill. However, by the end of February 2007, the Millers sat 13 points adrift of safety, making the threat of relegation almost inevitable. This resulted in Knill being sacked on 1 March, with Robins becoming caretaker manager. After a spell of three wins in six games while in charge as caretaker manager, and moving the club off the bottom of League One, Robins's position was made permanent on 6 April 2007. 

Robins gained much praise for his first two seasons with the Millers. The first saw Rotherham consistently in the automatic promotion places until a late dip in form, and the second almost brought promotion despite a 17-point deduction imposed by the Football League. Robins also attracted several high calibre players to the Don Valley Stadium, including League 2 player of the season Nicky Law and prolific goalscorer Adam Le Fondre.

Barnsley
Robins was appointed as the new manager of Barnsley on 9 September 2009, succeeding Simon Davey. After his first game in charge, the Championship club sat at the bottom of the table looking likely candidates for relegation. By Christmas, Robins had taken them a full nine points clear of the relegation zone and on a run of eight games unbeaten. This was followed by a poor spell towards the end of the season, and Barnsley finished 18th in the table. Robins resigned from his job at the end of the 2010–11 season, because of differences with the board.

Coventry City
On 19 September 2012, Robins was appointed as the new manager of Coventry City, signing a three-year deal. His first game was a 2–1 home defeat against Carlisle United at the Ricoh Arena.

Robins became a fan-favourite catapulting them up the league from relegation battlers to play-off contenders in the short time that he had been at the club.

Robins took the club to the Area Final of the Football League Trophy which left the club two games away from Wembley. Coventry City also had to face two Premier League clubs away from home during his time. The first, being Arsenal in the League Cup third round, which resulted in a 6–1 defeat and the second being Arsenal's North London rivals Tottenham Hotspur which ended as a 3–0 loss, knocking the Sky Blues out the FA Cup third round.

Robins was first linked with the vacant Doncaster Rovers position and various other clubs. On 12 February 2013, Coventry City released a statement saying they had allowed Robins to go into talks with Huddersfield Town about their vacant managerial position.

Huddersfield Town
On 14 February 2013, Robins was unveiled as the new manager of Huddersfield Town on a rolling contract. His first game in charge came three days later, a 4–1 defeat to Wigan Athletic in the FA Cup fifth-round at John Smith's Stadium. On 19 February 2013, Robins took charge of his first league match as Huddersfield manager, a 6–1 defeat away from home against Nottingham Forest. Robins earned his first win as Huddersfield manager on 26 February 2013, a 1–0 victory against Burnley at Turf Moor. Huddersfield avoided relegation to League One on the final day of the 2012–13 season after drawing 2–2 with Barnsley.

After surviving the following season, Robins and Huddersfield mutually agreed to part company after the first game of the 2014–15 season, a 4–0 home defeat to AFC Bournemouth.

Scunthorpe United
On 13 October 2014, Robins was appointed manager of League One club Scunthorpe United. After a run of two wins in eight games, Robins was sacked by Scunthorpe on 18 January 2016, leaving the club six points above the League One relegation zone.

Return to Coventry City
On 6 March 2017, Coventry City re-appointed Robins as manager with immediate effect, the day after the sacking of previous manager Russell Slade.

Against all the odds, on 2 April 2017, Robins led Coventry to a 2–1 victory over Oxford United in the EFL Trophy Final at Wembley. Robins won his first promotion as a manager after leading Coventry to a sixth-place finish in the 2017–18 EFL League Two, and winning the play-offs at Wembley. Over the course of the 2017–18 season, Robins broke numerous records as Coventry City manager including the club's first top six finish in 48 years, their first promotion in 51 years and their most points in a season. Robins's achievements gained much plaudits from local press and fans alike, when considering Coventry City had only moved down the Football League since relegation from the Premier League in 2001.

The win in the League Two Play Off Final, represented Coventry's third competitive win at Wembley and Robins' second trophy in just over a year.

After an 8th-place finish in the 2018–19 EFL League One season, Robins signed a new contract with the club in October 2019.

In the 2019–20 EFL League One season, Robins took Coventry City to the Championship after winning the league with just 3 defeats all season and unbeaten since 14 December 2019.

Mark Robins won the LMA League 1 Manager of the Year award.

On 8 May 2021, Robins guided Coventry City to beat Millwall 6–1 to secure a 16th-place finish, in the club's first season back in the Championship in nine years. The following season, Robins guided the Sky Blues to a 12th-place finish in the Championship, their highest league placing in over 10 years.

Robins signed a new deal with the club in May 2022. Robins said he was "delighted" to have signed a new deal.

Managerial statistics

Honours

As a player
Manchester United
FA Cup: 1989–90
FA Charity Shield: 1990
European Cup Winners' Cup: 1990–91
European Super Cup: 1991

Leicester City
Football League Cup: 1996–97
Football League First Division play-offs: 1996

Individual
Denzil Haroun Young Player of the Year: 1988–89
Denzil Haroun Reserve Team Player of the Year: 1989–90

As a manager
Coventry City
League One: 2019–20
League Two play-offs: 2017–18
EFL Trophy: 2016–17

Individual
League One Manager of the Month: December 2012, October 2015, October 2018, February 2020
League Two Manager of the Month: November 2007, August 2008

References

External links

Career information at ex-canaries.co.uk
FC Copenhagen statistics

1969 births
Living people
Footballers from Ashton-under-Lyne
English footballers
England under-21 international footballers
Association football forwards
Manchester United F.C. players
Norwich City F.C. players
Leicester City F.C. players
F.C. Copenhagen players
Reading F.C. players
CD Ourense footballers
Panionios F.C. players
Manchester City F.C. players
Walsall F.C. players
Rotherham United F.C. players
Bristol City F.C. players
Sheffield Wednesday F.C. players
Burton Albion F.C. players
English Football League players
Premier League players
National League (English football) players
English expatriate footballers
Expatriate men's footballers in Denmark
Expatriate footballers in Greece
Expatriate footballers in Spain
English expatriate sportspeople in Denmark
English expatriate sportspeople in Greece
English expatriate sportspeople in Spain
English football managers
Rotherham United F.C. managers
Barnsley F.C. managers
Coventry City F.C. managers
Huddersfield Town A.F.C. managers
Scunthorpe United F.C. managers
English Football League managers
FA Cup Final players